Macri, or perhaps Macras, was a town and bishopric in the Roman province of Mauretania Sitifensis. It corresponds to the modern town of Magra, Algeria.

History
This town figures only in the Notitia Africæ and the Itinerarium Antonini. It flourished for a long period, and Arabian authors often mention it in eulogistic terms. According to the 1910 Catholic Encyclopedia, it was situated on the Oued-Magra which still bears its name, near the Djebel Magra, in the plain of Bou Megueur, south-west of Sétif (in Algeria). The 2013 Annuario Pontificio places it at Henchir-Remada.

In 411 Macri had a Donatist bishop, Maximus, who attended the Carthage Conference of 411. In 479, the Vandal king Huneric banished a great many Catholics from this town and from many other regions of the desert. In 484 Emeritus, Bishop of Macri, was one of the members present at the Carthage Assembly; like the others, he was banished by Huneric.

References

Catholic titular sees in Africa